Stephanie LaCava (born 1985) is a writer based in New York City. LaCava began her career at American Vogue and her work has since appeared in The Believer, The New York Review of Books, Harper's Magazine, Texte zur Kunst, and The New Inquiry. 

Her first book, An Extraordinary Theory of Objects, was a memoir hybrid of narrative nonfiction and illustration. LaCava's 2020 novel, The Superrationals, is about female friendship, set at the intersection between counterculture and the multimillion dollar art industry. It received reviews in Frieze and Guernica. LaCava's second novel, I Fear My Pain Interests You is scheduled for publication by Verso Books in September 2022. The novel centers on a protagonist named Margot, the daughter of two famous musicians, who cannot feel physical pain.

Her novels have been described as "feel-bad books".

In addition to her writing, Stephanie LaCava is the founder of  Small Press, an independent publisher of new works in translation and artist-led visual narratives for children and adults.

Personal life
LaCava's family lived in Le Vésinet after her family was expatriated from Boston to France in the 1990s through her father’s job. LaCava has said that growing up in Le Vésinet as an American was "very lonely" and that she sought escape in books. She has described herself as having been "a misanthropic little kid" who "would rather read than socialize".

Her time in Le Vésinet is recounted in her first book, An Extraordinary Theory of Objects

LaCava studied international relations, international economics, and French.

References 

Vogue (magazine) people
Writers from New York City
Living people
1985 births
21st-century American novelists
21st-century American non-fiction writers
21st-century American women writers
American women non-fiction writers